Soyer is a surname of French and Turkish origin. It may refer to:

Alexis Soyer (1810–1858), French chef
Cyril Soyer (born 1978), French judoka
David Soyer (1923–2010), American cellist
Elizabeth Emma Soyer (1813–1842), British painter
Ferdi Sabit Soyer (born 1952), Cypriot politician
Isaac Soyer (1902–1981), American painter
Julie Soyer (born 1985), French football player
Moses Soyer (1899–1974), American painter
Raphael Soyer (1899–1987), American painter
Roger Soyer (born 1939), French singer
Sevil Soyer (born 1950), Turkish artist
Tunç Soyer (born 1959), Turkish politician (current Mayor of İzmir)

See also
Soyer (film)
Allemanche-Launay-et-Soyer, commune in Marne, France

French-language surnames
Jewish surnames
Turkish-language surnames